Major Richard John Wrottesley, 5th Baron Wrottesley MC (7 July 1918 – 23 October 1977), was a British peer and army officer.

Early life and education
Wrottesley was the only son of Hon Walter Bennet Wrottesley, 2nd son of Arthur Wrottesley, 3rd Baron Wrottesley, and his wife Kate May Harris, only daughter of Douglas Howard Harris, of Craddock, Cape Colony, South Africa. He was educated at Harrow.

He married Roshnara Barbara Wingfield-Stratford, only daughter of Captain Esmé Cecil Wingfield-Stratford DSC, of The Oaks, Berkhamsted, Hertfordshire, in 1941. They were divorced in 1949.

WWII service
He served with distinction in the Second World War and, as a captain with the Guards Armoured Division, is mentioned in A Bridge Too Far, the story of the battle for Arnhem. Another account of an incident near the Dutch town of Driel, during Operation Market Garden, reads:"Whilst he [Major General Stanislaw Sosabowski] was in the western sector of Driel he heard the sound of armoured cars approaching and naturally assumed them to be German. However using his binoculars he soon identified them as being British, and so immediately ordered that the anti-tank mines be removed from the road. The four scout vehicles, commanded by Captain Wrottesley of No.5 Troop, C Squadron, the 2nd Household Cavalry, had been able to break through the German defences north of Nijmegen under the cover of fog, and they encountered the Polish bicycle patrol soon a few hours before arriving at Driel."
     
For leading his troop of armoured cars through the German lines, and establishing contact with the Polish Parachute Brigade on the south bank of the River Rhine, Wrottesley won his Military Cross. Some years later Wrottesley met the officer commanding the German tanks to whom he had given the slip. The German informed Wrottesley's then wife, Mary, that: "I went to Berlin to get a blast from Hitler, and Dick went to get a medal from the King." He retired from the Army in 1950.

Post-War life
Wrottesley married Joyce Marion Wallace, daughter of Frederick Alexander Wallace and ex-wife of Sean Rainey, in 1949. In her obituary, published in the Daily Telegraph in 2006, it was reported that:In 1949 Marion met an Old Harrovian, Dick Wrottesley, in the Bag of Nails [sic] nightclub. The heir to Lord Wrottesley reputedly locked her in the lavatory until she had agreed to marry him.In spite of blissful summers at Wrottesley, near Wolverhampton, where the family had lived for 900 years, and the birth of their son Mark, the marriage broke down quickly. Dick Wrottesley had already told his wife: "I only married you for your tarty qualities."

They were divorced in 1953.

He married Mary Ada Van Echten Tudhope of Rondebosch, Cape Town, South Africa, only daughter of Edgar Dryden Tudhope, in 1955.  He succeeded to the baronetcy and barony on the death of his uncle in 1963. The Wrottesley family home, Wrottesley Hall, and estate was broken up when the 5th Baron sold in 1963 and moved to South Africa.

He died in October 1977, aged 59, and was succeeded in the baronetcy and barony by his grandson Clifton Hugh Lancelot de Verdon Wrottesley, 6th Baron Wrottesley.

See also
 Baron Wrottesley, and The Wrottesley Baronetcy
 Wrottesley Hall, Staffordshire

References

Kidd, Charles, Williamson, David (editors). Debrett's Peerage and Baronetage (1990 edition). New York: St Martin's Press, 1990.
The National Archives, London, England

1918 births
1977 deaths
People educated at Harrow School
Barons in the Peerage of the United Kingdom
People from Chapel-en-le-Frith
Royal Horse Guards officers
British Army personnel of World War II
Recipients of the Military Cross